Assawoman may refer to:

 Assawoman, Virginia, United States, an unincorporated community
 Assawoman Bay, a lagoon in Maryland and Delaware, United States
 Assawoman Bay Bridge, a bridge carrying Maryland State Route 90 over Assawoman Bay
 Assawoman Canal, a canal in Sussex County, Delaware, United States
 Assawoman Wildlife Area, a state wildlife area in Sussex County, Delaware
 Little Assawoman Bay, a lagoon in Sussex County, Delaware, United States